Björn Georg Wilhelm Westerlund, titled Vuorineuvos (27 January 1912 in Hanover, Germany – 11 March 2009 in Helsinki, Finland), was a Finnish businessman and a short-time minister in the government of Finland. He was the former and first President and CEO of Nokia Corporation that was formed in a 1967 merger between the three Finnish companies Nokia Company, Finnish Rubber Works and Kaapelitehdas (Cable Company). He was the CEO until his retirement in 1977. He remained Chairman of the Board until 1979.

He was also the Minister of Trade and Industry for a short while (19 June to 14 July 1961) in V. J. Sukselainen's second government, as a representative of Swedish People's Party.

References

External links
 Westerlund, Björn (1912–2009). Kansallisbiografia .

1912 births
2009 deaths
People from the Province of Hanover
Swedish-speaking Finns
Swedish People's Party of Finland politicians
Ministers of Trade and Industry of Finland
20th-century Finnish businesspeople
Nokia people